Interpellation may refer to:

 Interpellation (philosophy), the process by which we encounter a culture's or ideology's values and internalize them
 Interpellation (politics), the right of the members to ask questions from the government

See also

 Interpellator